Pharopora is an extinct genus of bryozoan of the family Rhabdomesidae that lived in the Mississippian period. It is characterized by colonies with branches possessing regular internodes and articulating cone-shaped terminations. It is the first genus of bryozoan in the family Rhabdomesidae with articulated (jointed) parts in its colonies.

References

Prehistoric bryozoan genera